Destination America is an American cable television channel owned by the Warner Bros. Discovery Networks unit of Warner Bros. Discovery. The network carries programming focused on the culture of the United States—including food, lifestyles, and travel. The network first launched in 1996 as Discovery Travel & Living Network, as part of a suite of four digital cable networks the company launched that year. From its launch until 2008, the network primarily focused upon home improvement, cooking, and leisure-themed programs.

In 2008, the channel re-launched as Planet Green, which carried a focus on environmentalism and sustainable living; Discovery spent $50 million on developing programming for the channel. Planet Green was ultimately considered a failure; by 2010, the channel had shifted away from its format and filled its schedule with miscellaneous library programming, pending a future rebranding.

In May 2012, the channel re-launched as Destination America, which originally featured programming focused on American culture; the channel's format was similar to Travel Channel, and also featured Discovery-owned library programs that had previously aired on Travel Channel prior to its divestment of the channel.

By 2017, Destination America had rebranded as a channel focusing on paranormal topics and investigations. This format ended following Discovery's acquisition of Travel Channel's then-present owner Scripps Networks Interactive. In 2018, when Travel Channel was rebranded with a similar paranormal format, Destination America returned to its previous format using both companies' libraries.

As of February 2015, approximately 57,238,000 American households (49.2% of households with television) receive Destination America.

History 
The space was originally used for one of the four digital cable networks launched by Discovery Communications in 1996. The new networks were first announced in November 1994, with a launch planned for Spring 1995. At the time, the network had the working title Living and was described as "a home repair network". The launch was delayed, and the channel made its debut in October 1996, originally known as Discovery Travel & Living Network and offering programming including do-it-yourself projects, cooking, interior design and landscaping, and party planning.

By 1998, it had settled on the name Discovery Home & Leisure, but the "Leisure" part of the name was dropped on March 29, 2004, when the channel became Discovery Home Channel. Much of the travel-related programming was dropped in the process to provide more focus on home improvement and cooking.

Planet Green 

In April 2007, during its upfronts, Discovery announced that Discovery Home would re-launch in 2008 as a new channel focused on environmentalism and sustainable living. The channel itself was announced as part of a $50 million corporate initiative known as "Planet Green", undertaken under Discovery's new CEO David Zaslav, which would include the production of programming on other Discovery channels (such as the Discovery Channel series Ten Ways to Save the Planet) that appeal to these themes, an "innovation conference", and making its headquarters carbon neutral. Zaslav stated that Discovery Home had been economically sound, but wasn't "serving this higher purpose". On August 1, 2007, Discovery announced its acquisition of TreeHugger, a blog focusing on sustainable living. The site was to be positioned as a digital companion to the new channel.

In October 2007, Discovery hired veteran producer Andy Friendly as a consultant for Planet Green's programming, and to executive produce a series for the channel. The new series, Supper Club, was announced in January 2008, and would be hosted by Tom Bergeron (whom Friendly had helped cast as host for the 1998 syndicated version of Hollywood Squares).

Further programming details were announced in Discovery's April 2008 upfronts, including specials hosted by NBC News correspondent Tom Brokaw, the reality show Battleground Earth with Ludacris and Tommy Lee, Emeril Green, Hollywood Green with Maria Menounos, and the Bill Nye-hosted Stuff Happens, among other series. It was announced that the network would launch on June 4, 2008, and that a "sneak peek" of the network's programming would become available via video on demand on April 17. Later that month, Planet Green ordered Focus Earth, a weekly environmental newsmagazine produced by ABC News and hosted by Bob Woodruff.

Planet Green was one of the two highly anticipated Discovery network re-launches spearheaded by Zaslav, the other being the Oprah Winfrey Network—a relaunch of Discovery Health that was ultimately delayed to January 2011.

Despite high expectations, the network's launch was unsuccessful; writing for NPR, Mark Hemingway observed that the majority of Planet Green's programs involved either home renovations or "self-righteous" celebrities, demonstrated that environmentalism was "pretty much a luxury item", and that it "[seemed] dedicated to airing three hours per day of Emeril Green, the chef's new cooking show, which despite a few feints at 'buying local' is indistinguishable from much of what's already on the Food Network." He did feel that Focus Earth and Stuff Happens were relatively better programs, describing the former as being "informative and shockingly fair to business interests".

In March 2010, Planet Green's programming was broadened to include non-ecology themed shows, such as The Fabulous Beekman Boys; despite this broadened focus, in February 2011, Discovery Communications executives were acknowledging the channel's failure. Zaslav stated in a conference call with investors that Discovery "can probably do something else with that that would be more meaningful." Shortly thereafter the channel had abandoned its theme, rerunning programs from other Discovery Communications channels and featuring programming blocks such as "Paranormal Fridays". Discovery announced a probable rebranding of the channel by the start of the summer of 2012.

Destination America 

On April 4, 2012, Discovery announced through the early release of an article in USA Today that Planet Green would be re-branded as Destination America, a network focusing primarily on cuisine, natural history, and travel programming, appealing primarily towards Middle America. The launch lineup also featured programs that had previously aired on Travel Channel before its sale to Cox Communications. The channel was originally expected to have a Memorial Day launch on May 28, 2012.

In 2015, the network began to experiment with professional wrestling by picking up TNA programming (which had recently been dropped by Spike), including its flagship weekly program Impact Wrestling. Later that year, the network also announced that it had signed a 26-week television deal for Ring of Honor's weekly show, Ring of Honor Wrestling, which would begin on June 3, 2015. Impact moved to Pop in January 2016.

The network also began to increase its focus on programs dealing with paranormal topics and investigations; on October 30, 2015, it aired Exorcism Live—a live special broadcast from the St. Louis site of the exorcism of Roland Doe, featuring the cast of Ghost Asylum and Chip Coffey. The March 4, 2016 premiere of Paranormal Lockdown was among the highest-rated series premieres in the channel's history, which prompted further growth in the channel's focus on paranormal series. Destination America underwent a rebranding in 2017, with on-air presentation carrying a darker and "uneasy" atmosphere (including a signature "glitch" effect) to reflect its change in programming direction.

Discovery's 2018 acquisition of Scripps Networks Interactive brought Travel Channel back under its ownership; a rebranding of Travel Channel in October 2018 repositioned the network to focus more on paranormal programming. Since then, Destination America's schedule has largely shifted back towards its original format, drawing from Discovery and SNI's program libraries.

Programming

Planet Green
Planet Green programming included ecologically themed shows built around celebrities including Ed Begley Jr., Emeril Lagasse, Adrian Grenier, Leonardo DiCaprio, Ludacris, Tommy Lee, Tom Bergeron, SuChin Pak, Maria Menounos, Bob Woodruff, and Discovery Channel producer Tom Golden. In addition, celebrities gave 'green' tips within network bumpers that transitioned into and out of commercial breaks. The channel was programmed in eight-hour blocks, which repeated three times per day until April 2010. Lacking separate satellite feeds for the East and West coasts of the United States, prime-time programs ran from 8p.m. to 11p.m. Eastern Time and were then repeated.

Shows previously seen on Planet Green include:

A Haunting 1
Airplane Repo
Blood Sweat and T-Shirts
Born Dealers
Coastwatch
Cool Fuel
Dean Of Invention
Dresscue Me
Emeril Green
The Fabulous Beekman Boys
Famous, Rich and Homeless 
Fast Forward
Future Food
G Word
Go for the Green
Gutted
In Search Of Perfection 
Living With Ed
Operation Wild
Planet Mechanics
Prehistoric1
Renovation Nation
Stuff Happens
Total Wrecklamation
Treehugger TV
Wa$ted! 3
What Sank Titanic? 1

Former programming

 A Haunting
Alaska Monsters
Alaska Wildlife Troopers
Alien Mysteries
Aliens on the Moon
American Factory
American Loggers 1
Amish Haunting
Armageddon Arsenals
Auction Kings
Babe Winkelman's Outdoor Secrets
BBQ Pitmasters: Father vs. Son
Bill Dance Outdoors
Buying Alaska
Buying Hawaii
Buying the Beach
Cheating Vegas
Destroyed in Seconds 1
Disney's Animal Kingdom
Disney Cruise Line: Behind the Magic
Disneyland Resort: Behind the Scenes
Epic Homes
Epic Log Homes
Fact or Faked: Paranormal Files
Fast Food Mania
Flip That House
Food Factory
Ghosts in my House
Ghosts of Shepherdstown
Ghost Stalkers
Hauntings and Horrors
Hidden in America
TNA: Impact Wrestling
Impact Wrestling: Unlocked
Last Call Food Brawl
Mega Engineering
Mighty Ships
Mountain Monsters (moved to Travel Channel)
Project Afterlife
Railroad Alaska
Ring of Honor Wrestling
Road Trip Masters
Swamp Loggers
UFOs Over Earth
Ultimate Walt Disney World
United States of Bacon
Walt Disney World Resort: Behind the Scenes
 Alaska Haunting: Dead of Winter
 Alaska Monsters: Bigfoot Edition
 Alaska: The Last Frontier
 America: Facts vs. Fiction
 America's Most Haunted Asylum
 Amish Haunting
 Babies, Babies, Babies
 BBQ Pit Wars
 BBQ Pitmasters
 Beach Hunters
 Big Beach Builds
 Buying Alaska
 Buying Hawaii
 Buying the Bayou
 Buying Rockies
 Buying the Yukon
 Carnival Eats
 Chopped Junior
 Crikey! It's the Irwins 2
 Evil Things
 Exorcism: Live!
 Expedition Unknown
 Extreme Homes
 Ghost Asylum
 Ghost Brothers
 Ghosts of Shepherdstown
 Haunted Case Files
 Haunted Towns
 Helltown
 Hometime (U.S. TV series)
 Hooked on the Palm Beaches
 House Hunters Family
 How the Universe Works 1
 Incredible Inventions
 Kids Baking Championship
 Killing Bigfoot
 Kindred Spirits
 Lakefront Bargain Hunt
 Little People, Big World 3
 Log Cabin Living
 Maine Cabin Masters
 Man, Fire, Food
 Man vs. Bear
 Man's Greatest Food
 Monsters and Mysteries in America
 Monsters and Mysteries Unsolved
 Moonshiners 1
 Mountain Monsters
 MythBusters Jr.
 On Location
 OutDaughtered
 Paranormal Lockdown
 Paranormal Lockdown UK
 Passport to the Palm Beaches
 Pool Kings
 Project Afterlife
 Railroad Alaska
 Steak Out with Kix Brooks
 Swamp Loggers 1
 The Demon Files
 The Exorcist File: Haunted Boy
 The Haunted: Death Rises
 The Scott Martin Challenge
 The Treehouse Guys
 The World's Strangest UFO Stories
 The Zoo 2
 These Woods are Haunted
 Tiny House Big Living
 Tiny Luxury
 Too Cute 2
 UFOs: The Untold Stories
 UFOs: Uncovering the Truth
 What History Forgot
 When Ghosts Attack
 Wild Food
 Xtreme Waterparks

References

External links 
 

 
Television channels and stations established in 1996
Warner Bros. Discovery networks
English-language television stations in the United States
1996 establishments in Maryland